Barlby High School is a mixed secondary school located in Barlby, North Yorkshire, England. The school opened in 1960.

Previously a community school administered by North Yorkshire County Council, in September 2017 Barlby High School converted to academy status and is now sponsored by the Hope Sentamu Learning Trust.

The school offers GCSEs and BTECs as programmes of study for pupils.

Notable former pupils

Sam Bettley, bassist of Asking Alexandria
Nigel Cumberland, author
Russell Howarth, former footballer

References

External links
Barlby High School official website

Secondary schools in North Yorkshire
Academies in North Yorkshire
1960 establishments in England
Educational institutions established in 1960